Sergey Yuryevich Grankin (born 21 January 1985) is a Russian volleyball player, a former member of the Russian national team. 2012 Olympic Champion, two–time European Champion (2013, 2017), and a multiple World League medallist. At the professional club level, he plays for Fakel Novy Urengoy.

Career
Sergey Grankin started playing volleyball at the age of 7. Sergey Grankin captained the Youth team of Russia at the victorious European Championship in 2004 in Croatia, and the 2005 World Championships in India, where he first confidently made himself known. Mostly due to the mood of their captain, the Russians won the final match over Brazil in the first set when the score was 23:16 in favor of their rivals, the Russian scored 7 points in a row with Grankin serving , pulled out a losing set and broke down the Brazilians who lost the following two sets. He competed at the 2008 Summer Olympics where Russia claimed the bronze medal and at the 2012 Summer Olympics where Russia won the gold. He married his fiance Bruna de Araujo on 19 August 2012. At the 2013 European Volleyball Championship - where Russia won the gold medal and was awarded as the best setter of the tournament.

Sporting achievements

Clubs
 CEV Champions League
  2009/2010 – with Dynamo Moscow

 CEV Cup
  2011/2012 – with Dynamo Moscow
  2014/2015 – with Dynamo Moscow
  2017/2018 – with Belogorie Belgorod

 National championships
 2006/2007  Russian Cup, with Dynamo Moscow
 2007/2008  Russian Championship, with Dynamo Moscow
 2008/2009  Russian SuperCup, with Dynamo Moscow
 2008/2009  Russian Cup, with Dynamo Moscow
 2009/2010  Russian SuperCup, with Dynamo Moscow
 2018/2019  German Championship, with Berlin Recycling Volleys
 2019/2020  German SuperCup, with Berlin Recycling Volleys
 2019/2020  German Cup, with Berlin Recycling Volleys
 2020/2021  German SuperCup, with Berlin Recycling Volleys
 2020/2021  German Championship, with Berlin Recycling Volleys
 2021/2022  German SuperCup, with Berlin Recycling Volleys
 2021/2022  German Championship, with Berlin Recycling Volleys

Individual awards
 2003: CEV U19 European Championship – Best Setter
 2010: FIVB World League – Best Setter
 2013: CEV European Championship – Best Setter
 2017: CEV European Championship – Best Setter

References
Profile Rsv

External links

 
 
 
 Player profile at Volleybox.net

1985 births
Living people
People from Yessentuki
Sportspeople from Stavropol Krai
Russian men's volleyball players
Olympic volleyball players of Russia
Volleyball players at the 2008 Summer Olympics
Volleyball players at the 2012 Summer Olympics
Volleyball players at the 2016 Summer Olympics
Medalists at the 2008 Summer Olympics
Medalists at the 2012 Summer Olympics
Olympic medalists in volleyball
Olympic bronze medalists for Russia
Olympic gold medalists for Russia
Russian expatriate sportspeople in Germany
Expatriate volleyball players in Germany
VC Belogorie players
Setters (volleyball)